Westleigh or West Leigh was a station in Leigh, Greater Manchester, England on the Bolton and Leigh Railway line. Westleigh was situated within the historic county of Lancashire. Its station opened in 1831 and closed in 1954.

History
The Bolton and Leigh Railway reached Leigh in 1830 and was extended by the construction of the Kenyon and Leigh Junction Railway, which received Royal Assent in 1829, to Kenyon Junction by 1831 creating a junction with the Liverpool and Manchester Railway. The station at Westleigh was named Leigh when it opened for passengers in 1831 and its name changed in 1876. Following amalgamations, from 1846 it was owned by the London & North Western Railway.

Structure and operations

The station was certainly popular, Sweeney reports that 3,393 tickets were issued at Leigh during the holiday week of 1852. Special trains were run to Newton races and in 1859 fast excursion trains picked up passengers at Leigh on the way to Holyhead to see Brunel's  steamship.

West Leigh had both passenger and a goods stations. The passenger station had two platforms. The goods station was on the west side of the line and had a 2 ton capacity crane. Sweeney reports the goods yard closed in 1864 when the yard at Bedford Leigh station opened but it is still listed in by the Railway Clearing House in 1904.

In the 1930s up to 20 trains per day operated between Kenyon Junction and Bolton via Westleigh. Stations on the line became part of the London Midland and Scottish Railway in 1923 and the London Midland Region of British Railways on nationalisation in 1948. They were closed by the British Transport Commission six years later in 1954 when the line to Bolton Great Moor Street closed.

Holiday excursion trains and Rugby League specials called at the station up to 1958.

References

Citations

Bibliography

Further reading

External links
 The station on a 1948 OS map via npe maps
 The station on an 1888 OS map overlay via National Library of Scotland
 The station and line via railwaycodes

Disused railway stations in the Metropolitan Borough of Wigan
Former London and North Western Railway stations
Railway stations in Great Britain opened in 1831
Railway stations in Great Britain closed in 1954
History of the Metropolitan Borough of Wigan
Buildings and structures in Leigh, Greater Manchester